The Federation of European Carnival Cities (FECC) was founded in 1980 and has been registered in the Court of Luxembourg. Member cities, organization and individual members are engaged in producing popular celebrations or carnivals which represent an authentic masquerade or parade of a people's cultural identity. The General membership meets twice each year generally at the end of May and in October.

History
On the occasion of the 700th anniversary of Amsterdam (The Nederlands), Carnival Princes from all over the world met each other in the Amsterdam RAI congress centre in November 1975. The Amsterdam Carnival Association, governed by Mr.Henk van der Kroon was called "Amstelpieren & Brokkerijders."  The big event brought an unprecedented number of Carnival Associations from different countries together. The guests of honour included Her Royal Highness Princess Margriet of the Netherlands as well as diplomats and dignitaries from afar including Brazil, Greece, Germany and Belgium. This unique event is widely recognized as the starting point for the lasting contacts and exchanges between associations and cities that has become the FECC.

In 1980, international carnival associations met in Patras (Greece), again under the initiative of the Amsterdam Carnival Association Ämstelpieren & Bfrokkerijders. It is generally accepted that the FECC (Foundation of European Carnival) came into existence during this meeting. At the 5th reunion in Kos-Patmos (Greece), which took place in 1985, a membership was introduced and it was decided to drawn up rules and bylaws. The first countries that became a member of the Foundation were Belgium, Netherlands, Luxembourg, England and Malta. Articles of association were formulated and the creation of FECC was registered in the Grand Duchy of Luxembourg. Directly following the 1987 7th reunion in Malta, the Belgian members founded their own section FECC-Belgium with its own governing board. In 1988 FECC-Germany founded their own section as did FECC-Netherlands and FECC –Luxembourg. The first elected International President was Mr. Henk van der Kroon.

Throughout the year the International President and other board members travel to member cities and interested Carnivals to learn, educate and often officiate at the ceremonies surrounding what is often the most important annual event for the community and even country. The FECC is a global organization holding its first annual convention outside the Mediterranean in the twin island Republic of Trinidad and Tobago in 1987. Many Carnivals, particularly those in Eastern Europe, have grown up under the mentorship of FECC engagement. Since its founding, the FECC has been the only unswerving organization consistently speaking for the interests and concerns of Carnival organizations. Representatives from Carnival organizations in over 50 countries are members and annual conventions generally have several Mayors seeking ways to bring more international recognition and culturally oriented tourists to their festivals.

Annual Carnival City Congress
Once a year, all FECC members: cities, associations and individual members are invited to an international assembly. This convention is organized by a member-city and takes place every year in a different country.
The convention lasts 1 week end takes place between end mid-May and mid- June. These conventions enjoy a lot of interest: every year, participants from more than 20 countries are present.
During these annual conventions, the members get an international forum which enables them to promote their carnival and their town on the occasion of seminars and workshops.

Direct personal contacts with the numerous participants can also increase the international publicity of a member's carnival and/of town.
The organizers of the convention moreover, use these gatherings to show the participants a few tourist attractions and places of interest of their town and the surrounding area.

The 11 October 1980 marks the founding of the FECC and it is observed by the FECC membership with a 'Dies Natalis' celebration. This weekend gathering is hosted by a member city.

Conventions

Also forthcoming 
2023 43Rd FECC Convention in ?, ?

Structure
The FECC is open to membership in the following categories:

Public bodies (municipalities, national art commissions etc.)
Professional NGOs
Amateur organizations

The structure is as follows:
International General Assembly
Presidium/ Board of Directors ( formed by national chairmen or representatives)
International Executive Board (term of administration is 3 years)
Audit Committee
Senators (advisers) formed by former board members and prominent persons

The objectives are:
exchange of knowledge concerning financing, fundraising and structures
consulting organizations
teaching and consulting construction of allegories floats
motivation techniques for volunteers
promoting carnival towards European institutions as cultural heritage
organizing an annual convention
collecting information concerning various carnival traditions
exchange-programs for clubs/bands, especially youth

External links
FECC main website
FECC Belgium (English, français & Deutsch)
FECC Germany (all languages)
FECC Croatia (hrvatski only)
FECC Netherlands (Nederlands only)
FECC history

Festival organizations in Europe
Carnivals